Robert C. Lord (born February 3, 1930) is a former American football coach. He was the head football coach at North Park College—now known as North Park University—from 1962 to 1963, Macalester College from 1964 to 1965, and Guilford College from 1968 to 1969, compiling a career college football record of ten wins and 49 losses. Lord also served as an assistant coach for nine seasons in the National Football League (NFL), working for the Chicago Bears, Green Bay Packers and New York Giants.

Head coaching record

College

References

1930 births
Living people
American football defensive backs
American football halfbacks
Appalachian State Mountaineers football coaches
Berlin Thunder coaches
Chicago Bears coaches
Frankfurt Galaxy coaches
Green Bay Packers coaches
Guilford Quakers football coaches
Liberty Flames football coaches
Macalester Scots football coaches
Morehead State Eagles football coaches
New York Giants coaches
North Park Vikings football coaches
Northern Colorado Bears football players
Rhein Fire coaches
UMass Minutemen football coaches
United States Football League coaches
Wake Forest Demon Deacons football coaches
Wesleyan Cardinals football coaches
High school football coaches in Georgia (U.S. state)
People from Brunswick, Maine
Players of American football from Maine